Tony Furman is an American politician and real estate agent serving as a member of the Arkansas House of Representatives from the 28th district. Elected in November 2020, he assumed office on January 11, 2021.

Education 
Furman graduated from Glen Rose High School in Malvern, Arkansas and earned a Bachelor of Arts degree in political science from Henderson State University.

Career 
Outside of politics, Furman works as a real estate agent for Crye-Leike Realtors. He was elected to the Arkansas House of Representatives in November 2020 and assumed office on January 11, 2021.

References 

Living people
People from Benton, Arkansas
Henderson State University alumni
Republican Party members of the Arkansas House of Representatives
Year of birth missing (living people)